Yury (or Yuriy or Yuri) Mikhailovich Bunkov (Юрий Михайлович Буньков, 29 August 1950 in Stavropol) is a Russian experimental physicist, specializing in condensed matter physics. He is known as one of the co-discoverers of the quantum spin liquid state.

Education and career
Bunkov, born into a family of geologists, graduated in 1968 from a special school for physics and mathematics in Moscow (School No. 2). In 1968 he also achieved first place in the Moscow Physics Olympiad and matriculated at the Moscow Institute of Physics and Technology (MIPT), which was headed by Piotr Kapitza.

According to Bunkov, the "parametric echo" should be called the "Bunkov echo":

In 1974 he matriculated at the Kapitza Institute for Physical Problems, where he received in 1979 his Candidate of Sciences degree (Ph.D.). A. S. Borovik-Romanov was Bunkov's thesis advisor. At the Kapitza Institute for Physical Problems, he was employed as a non-principal scientist from 1979 to 1985, a principal scientist from 1985 to 1986, and from 1986 to 1995 as a leading scientist. At the Kapitza Institute he constructed the Soviet Union's first nuclear demagnetization refrigerator.

In 1983 at the Kapitza Institute, quantum spin superfluidity was discovered by Bunkov, who was the team leader, with Vladimir Dmitriev and Yuri Mukharsky (who worked at the Kapitza Institute as students). Spin superfluidity manifested itself in NMR studies on 3helium-B as regions of coherent Larmor precession (regions known as HPDs, Homogeneously Precessing Domains), with inhomogeneities in the precession caused by supercurrents in the spin (based on magnetization) similar to those in superconductivity (based on charge-supercurrent) and superliquid or Bose-Einstein condensates (based on mass-supercurrent). Spin superfluidity is also a Bose-Einstein condensate (BEC) of magnons. A theoretical explanation was given in the 1980s by the theorist Igor Akindinovich Fomin.

Bunkov wrote concerning his work at the Kapitza Institute:

At the Kapitza Institute, he received in 1985 his Russian Doctor of Sciences degree (habilitation) with a thesis on NMR studies on superfluid helium-3. At Grenoble's Institut Néel (formerly called CRTBT), belonging to the Centre National de la Recherche Scientifique (CNRS), he was employed from 1995 to 2004 as a Directeur de Recherche and since 2004 is employed as a Directeur de Recherche de 1er classe. From 2008 to the present, he is a part-time professor at Kazan Federal University.

For many years Bunkov participated in the Soviet-Finnish project ROTA, in which the researchers discovered many different types of 3He vortices. He also made many visits (from 1989 to 1995) to Lancaster University, where he participated in NMR experiments at record-setting low temperatures for 3He.

At CRTBT his research group cooled 3He to 100°K and, at such low temperatures, found in 1996 an energy deficit after a 3He neutron capture reaction. The energy deficit "appeared to arise from vortex creation via the Kibble-Zurek cosmological mechanism, in analogy with cosmic-string creation in the early Universe." He became the leader of the project ULTIMA (Ultra Low Temperature Instrumentation for Measurements in Astrophysics), which has as its purpose the development of a dark-matter detector based on overcooled superfluid 3He.

In the 3He-B phase (which has a complex phase structure) he experimentally discovered analogues to cosmological and quantum field theoretical phenomena, such as cosmological strings (as vortices in the spin supercurrent) and Majorana quasiparticles. In the 1980s he and his colleagues detected Goldstone modes (as phonons in the spin-superfluidity HPDs analogous to the second sound phenomena in superfluids). In the 2000s he discovered Q-balls] in superfluid 3He. (The concept of a Q-ball, a type of non-topological soliton, was originally introduced in quantum field theory.)

He collaborated extensively with the theorist Grigori Efimovich Volovik. In 2008, Bunkov and his Japanese colleagues discovered coherent precession in the helium-3-A phase embedded in uniaxially deformed anisotropic aerogels.

Bunkov is internationally recognized for his research on quantum fluids and solids, superfluid 3He nuclear magnetic resonance {NMR), and oltra-low temperatures techniques and their application to cosmology and the search for dark matter. As of the end of 2018 his Hirsch index was 26.

Bunkov received in 1993 the State Prize of the Russian Federation "for the discovery of magnetic superfluidity and the Homogeneously Precessing Domain". In 2001 Bunkov was made Doctor "Honoris Causa" by Pavol Jozef Šafárik University in Košice, Slovakia. In 2008 he was awarded, jointly  with Vladimir Dmitriev and Igor A. Fomin, the Fritz London Memorial Prize for their discovery and elucidation of "unique phenomena in superfluid 3He-B: macroscopi phase-coherent spin precession and the flow of spin supercurrent." Bunkov has been a full member of the Academia Europaea since 2010.

Selected publications
with A.S. Borovik-Romanov, V.V. Dmitriev, Yu.M. Mukharskiĭ:  Long-lived induction signal in superfluid in 3-He, JETP Lett., vol. 40, no. 6, 1984, pp. 1033–1037 (translated by Dave Parsons) pdf
with V.V. Dmitriev, Yu.M. Mukharskiy: Twist oscillations of homogeneous precession domain in 3He-B, JETP Lett., vol. 43, 1986, pp. 168–171. (Goldstone mode)
with A. S. Borovik-Romanov: Spin supercurrent and magnetic relaxation in Helium-3, Harwood Academic Publ. 1990.
with V.V.Dmitriev, Yu.M. Mukharskiy, Low frequency oscillations of the homogeneously precessing domain in 3He-B, Physica B, vol. 178, 1992, pp. 196–201.  (Goldstone mode)
Persistent signal; coherent NMR state trapped by orbital texture, J. Low Temp. Phys., vol. 138, 2005, pp. 753–758,  (Q-Ball)
with  G.E. Volovik: Magnon condensation into a Q-ball in 3He-B, Phys. Rev. Lett., vol. 98, 2007, p. 265302. 
Spin Supercurrent, J. of Magnetism and Magnetic Materials (2007 article published in 2018). Arxiv 2007
with T. Sato, T. Kunimatsu, K. Izumina, A. Matsubara, M. Kubota, T. Mizusaki: Coherent precession of magnetization in the superfluid 3He A-phase, Phys. Rev. Lett., vol. 101, 2008, p. 055301. 
with G. E. Volovik: Bose-Einstein Condensation of Magnons in Superfluid 3He, J. Low Temperature Physics, vol. 150, 2008, pp. 135–144. 
with G.E. Volovik: Magnon BEC in superfluid 3He-A, JETP Lett., vol. 89, 2009, pp. 306–310. 
with G. E. Volovik: Magnon BEC and spin superfluidity: a 3He primer, Arxiv 2009
Spin superfluidity and magnons Bose-Einstein-Condensation, Physics Uspekhi, August 2010, Online
with G. E. Volovik:  Spin superfluidity and magnon BEC, in: Int. Ser. Monogr. Phys. 156, 2013, pp. 253–311, Arxiv
with Rasul Gazizuzin: Observation of Majorana Quasiparticles Surface States in Superfluid 3He-B by Heat Capacity Measurements,  Arxiv 2016
with Vladimir Safonov: Magnon Condensation and Spin Superfluidity, Arxiv 2017
 with  A. Farhutdinov. A. Kuzmichev, T. R. Safin, P. M. Vetoshko, V. I. Belotelov. and V. I. Tagirov: The magnonic superfluid droplet at room temperature. arXiv preprint arXiv:1911.03708 Arxiv 2019
Magnonic Superfluidity Versus Bose Condensation, Appl. Magn. Reson. vol. 51, 2020, pp. 1711–1721. 
with A. N. Kuzmichev, T. R. Safin, P. M. Vetoshko, V. I. Belotelov, and M. S. Tagirov: Quantum paradigm of the foldover magnetic resonance, Scientific Reports, vol. 11, no. 1, 2021, pp. 1–8.

References

External links
 

Soviet physicists
20th-century Russian physicists
21st-century Russian physicists
Condensed matter physicists
Moscow Institute of Physics and Technology alumni
French National Centre for Scientific Research scientists
Academic staff of Kazan Federal University
Members of Academia Europaea
State Prize of the Russian Federation laureates
1950 births
Living people
People from Stavropol